JBoss Developer Studio (JBDS) is a development environment created and currently developed by JBoss (a division of Red Hat) and Exadel.

It integrates and certifies both tooling and runtime components by combining Eclipse, Eclipse Tooling, and the JBoss Enterprise Application Platform.

The built-in development tools are used to build rich Web applications using open source technologies like JBoss Seam, JBoss Application Server, Hibernate and JBoss jBPM.

JBoss Developer Studio is constantly updated to include the latest releases of Eclipse and Web Tools Project (WTP) and provides tools for JEE and web development, like:

 Java EE, JSF and JSP tools
 JPA tools
 Server tools
 Web services and WSDL tools
 HTML, CSS, and JavaScript tools
 XML, XML Schema and DTD tools

JBoss Developer Studio includes one entitlement to Red Hat Enterprise Linux, with built-in development tools, and Red Hat Network Access for development purposes.
JBoss Developer Studio is available for Windows, Linux and Mac OS X 10.4 Tiger 10.4x. JBDS 5.0 comes integrated with JBoss EAP 6.0 that requires JDK 6.0 to run.

JBoss Developer Studio and JBoss Tools
JBoss Tools is a non-commercial project of JBoss Developer Studio. It is a set of Eclipse-based plugins for JBoss related technology such as Seam, Hibernate/JPA, JSF, EJB3, JBossESB, JBossWS, Portal etc.

JBoss Tools are a set of Eclipse plugins to which JBoss Developer Studio adds:
an installer
Eclipse and Web Tools preconfigured
JBoss EAP with JBoss AS and Seam preconfigured
3rd party plugins bundled and configured
access to RHEL and Red Hat Network
access to the JBoss/Red Hat supported software

History
In March 2007, Exadel and Red Hat announced a strategic partnership that added Eclipse-based developer tools for building service-oriented architecture (SOA) and Web 2.0 applications to Red Hat's integrated platform, including Red Hat Enterprise Linux and JBoss Enterprise Middleware.

JBoss Developer Studio Releases:

5 October 2007 - 1.0.0.CR1 
10 December 2007 - 1.0.0.GA 
8 May 2008 - 1.1.0.CR1 
2 June 2008 - 1.1.0.GA

31 October 2008 - 2.0.0.beta
7 January 2009 - 2.0.0.cr1
29 January 2009 - 2.0.0.cr2
17 March 2009 - 2.0.0.GA
28 September 2009 - 2.1 Portfolio Edition
15 December 2009 - 2.1.1

15 December 2009 - 3.0.0.M4
7 January 2010 - 3.0.0.CR1

16 February 2011 - 4.0.0
16 November 2011 - 4.1.1

22 June 2012 - 5.0.0

Features

JBoss Enterprise Application Platform. JBoss Developer Studio includes and integrates JBoss Enterprise Application Platform,  JBoss SOA Platform and JBoss Portal Platform, the same version of the middleware platform that Red Hat supports in production for 5 years.

New JBoss Seam Tools. JBoss Developer Studio includes brand new tools for Seam. They provide wizards for creating new Seam projects, validation tools, expression language code completion, testing tools, and wizards for generating entity objects.

Business Process Modeling Tools. JBoss Developer Studio provides a powerful business process designer tool create workflow processes. It also offers ability to managing workflow processes as well as human tasks and interactions between them. It includes the ability to convert BPMN to JPDL.

Business Rule Management Tools. JBoss Developer Studio includes support for the most widely used Business rules engine in the market, Drools. It offers graphical tools to create, edit and manage business rules, rule resources and decision tables.

SOA tools. JBoss Developer Studio includes rich set of tools to develop and deploy SOA based integration applications. It includes the ability to create, configure and deploy integration applications.

Data Transformation Tools - Smooks. Smooks transformation tools help transforming data from one format to another format. Multiple formats are supported for both source type and result type. Supported formats are CSV, EDI, XML, Java, JSON etc.

Portal Tools. JBoss Developer Studio includes tools to create and deploy portlets that are compatible with JSR 186/286. It also includes tools to easily create SEAM/JSF Portlets and deploy the same on JBoss Enterprise Portal Platform.

Visual Page Editor. JBoss Developer Studio includes a Visual Page Editor for combined visual and source editing of Web pages. The Visual Page Editor even renders AJAX-enabled RichFaces components.

AJAX Capabilities. JBoss Developer Studio includes a Technology Preview of JBoss RichFaces. RichFaces provides nearly 70 skinnable components, including calendar, tree, dropdown menu, drag-and-drop components, and more. JBoss Developer Studio’s Visual Page Editor can render RichFaces components.

JBoss Tools Palette. The JBoss Tools Palette contains a developer’s project tag libraries and enables inserting tags into a JSP with one click. The Tools Palette supports custom and 3rd party tags.

Hibernate Tools. Hibernate Tools provide robust, visual tools for the industry standard Hibernate object-relational-mapping framework. Hibernate Tools includes capabilities like reverse engineering and code generation from existing databases, Hibernate mapping and configuration editors, entity model views, dynamic query editors, and more.

JBoss jBPM Tools. JBoss Developer Studio includes jBPM tooling for defining Seam page flows.

Spring Tools. JBoss Developer Studio includes Spring IDE for developing Spring applications.

Struts Tools. JBoss Developer Studio includes Struts tools for Struts 1.x applications.

Optimized JBoss Application Server adapter. JBoss Developer Studio’s advanced JBoss AS adapter includes features like incremental deployment for fast development and is pre-configured for the included JBoss Application server.

Red Hat Enterprise Linux and RHN Access. JBoss Developer Studio includes access to Red Hat Enterprise Linux, Linux development tools, and Red Hat Network for development purposes.

Business Intelligence Report Tool (BIRT).  JBoss Developer Studio includes Business Intelligence Report Tool, a reporting system that integrates with Java/J2EE, extracts certain information, analyzes it, and generates report summaries and charts.

JBossWeb Service. JBoss WS is a web service framework developed as a part of the JBoss Application Server. It implements the JAX-WS specification that defines a programming model and run-time architecture for implementing web services in Java, targeted at the Java Platform, Enterprise Edition 5 (Java EE 5).

Teiid. JBoss Developer Studio includes Teiid, a data virtualization system that allows applications to use a uniform API to access data from multiple, heterogeneous data stores, handling relational, XML, XQuery and procedural queries. Teiid provides connectivity to most relational databases, web services, text files, and ldap to access and integrate data across distributed data sources without copying or otherwise moving data from its system of record.

See also
 List of JBoss software
 Comparison of integrated development environments
 Mule (software)

References

External links 
 http://www.jboss.com/products/devstudio

Red Hat software
Programming tools